The Bateshwar hills are situated in the Bhagalpur district, in Bihar state, India. They are located four miles (6 km) south of the town of Kursela. There is an ancient temple to Mahadeva (Shiva and Vishnu) located in the hills.

References

Bteshwar hills  a

Purnia division
Hills of Bihar